Warszawa Zachodnia station, in English Warsaw West, is a railway and long-distance bus station in Warsaw, Poland on the border of Ochota and Wola districts. The railway station is the westernmost terminus of the Warsaw Cross-City Line. It serves trains from PKP Intercity, Polregio, Koleje Mazowieckie, Szybka Kolej Miejska and Warszawska Kolej Dojazdowa as well as international trains passing through Warsaw.  It is one of the busiest railway stations in Poland, with over 800 daily trains.

Despite being one of the chief railway stations on the line towards Warszawa Centralna (Warsaw Central), there has been limited development of the station since its construction in 1936. However, the station is undergoing an extensive modernization between 2020 and 2023.

History
The station was built as part of the development of the Warsaw Railway Junction that was begun in 1919. Warszawa Zachodnia was opened in 1936 as the most westerly station on the Warsaw Cross-City Line. However, later efforts went into developing the stations in the center of Warsaw. It was not until the 1970s that an underpass was built to connect the platforms and a station building was built on the northern side. In 1975, a platform for Warszawska Kolej Dojazdowa trains was added. In 1980, the south side of the station was developed, with a road underpass being built to connect Wola and Ochota and the long-distance bus station added. In 2015 a new station building was opened at the southern side of the station along with several commercial office buildings, which among others host companies of the Polish State Railways, built along Warsaw's Jerozolimskie Avenue on grounds belonging to the station complex.
Future development plans call for the construction of a new tramway line by the Warsaw tramways with an 850 m long tunnel passing under the railway station, offering convenient transfer to the city's public transit system.

Platform 9

Warszawa Wola railway station was a railway station in the Wola district of Warsaw, Poland. On 20 May 2012 it was incorporated into Warszawa Zachodnia station as its Platform 8, and since the modernisation of Warszawa Zachodnia, it is currently marked as Warszawa Zachodnia peron 9 (Warsaw West railway station platform No. 9). Despite the change, it maintains all the functionality of Warszawa Wola.

The station was built in the 1980s just  from Warszawa Zachodnia station on the Warsaw orbital line, which goes through Warszawa Gdańska station. At the time of building, it served the workers who commuted to the neighbouring factories in the surrounding industrial area. As of 2011, it is used exclusively by Koleje Mazowieckie who run the KM9 services from it through the north of the Masovian Voivodeship to Działdowo, in the Warmian-Masurian Voivodeship via Legionowo, Modlin, Nasielsk, Ciechanów and Mława, at all of which some trains terminate.
Currently, all trains terminate at this station, but tracks exist and are used by freight trains to join the Cross-City Line past Warszawa Zachodnia station.

Modernization in 2020-2023 

In July, 2020 a contract worth 2.4 billion złoty (about $500 million euro)  was signed for a complete modernization of the station, planned to be completed in 2023. The rebuilt station will have platforms covered by a common roof.  Under the station a tunnel for trams will be constructed, with an underground tram stop serving the station.   During the 3 years of construction the passengers will experience some reductions in service, with some trains rerouted to other stations in Warsaw.  The station upgrade is part of the upgrade of the entire Warsaw Cross-City Line, which will last at least until 2027.

Gallery

Train services
Most long-distance trains going to Warszawa Centralna from the western direction also stop at Warszawa Zachodnia.  The station also services regional trains which do not stop at Warszawa Centralna, as well as a smaller number of trains that don't travel across Warsaw and instead terminate at Warszawa Główna.

The station is served by the following service(s):

EuroCity services (EC) (EC 95 by DB) (EIC by PKP) Berlin - Frankfurt (Oder) - Rzepin - Poznań - Kutno - Warsaw
Express Intercity Premium services (EIP) Gdynia - Warsaw
Express Intercity Premium services (EIP) Warsaw - Wrocław
Express Intercity Premium services (EIP) Warsaw - Katowice - Bielsko-Biała
Express Intercity Premium services (EIP) Gdynia - Warsaw - Katowice - Gliwice/Bielsko-Biała
Express Intercity Premium services (EIP) Warsaw - Kraków
Express Intercity Premium services (EIP) Gdynia/Kołobrzeg - Warsaw - Kraków (- Rzeszów)
Express Intercity services (EIC) Szczecin — Warsaw 
Express Intercity services (EIC) Warsaw - Wrocław 
Express Intercity services (EIC) Warsaw - Kraków - Zakopane 
Intercity services (IC) Warsaw  (Główna) — Łódź
 Intercity services (IC) Bydgoszcz Główna — Warszawa Główna
Intercity services (IC) Wrocław- Opole - Częstochowa - Warszawa
 Intercity services (IC) Wrocław - Ostrów Wielkopolski - Łódź - Warszawa
Intercity services (IC) Białystok - Warszawa - Częstochowa - Opole - Wrocław
Intercity services (IC) Białystok - Warszawa - Łódź - Ostrów Wielkopolski - Wrocław
Intercity services (IC) Ełk - Białystok - Warszawa - Łódź - Ostrów Wielkopolski - Wrocław
Intercity services (IC) Białystok - Warszawa - Częstochowa - Katowice - Bielsko-Biała
Intercity services (IC) Olsztyn - Warszawa - Skierniewice - Łódź
Intercity services (IC) Olsztyn - Warszawa - Skierniewice - Częstochowa - Katowice - Bielsko-Biała
Intercity services (IC) Olsztyn - Warszawa - Skierniewice - Częstochowa - Katowice - Gliwice - Racibórz
Intercity services (TLK) Warszawa - Częstochowa - Lubliniec - Opole - Wrocław - Szklarska Poręba Górna
Intercity services (TLK) Warszawa - Częstochowa - Katowice - Opole - Wrocław - Szklarska Poręba Górna
Intercity services (TLK) Gdynia Główna — Zakopane 
 InterRegio services (IR) Łódź Fabryczna — Warszawa Glowna 
 InterRegio services (IR) Łódź Kaliska — Warszawa Glowna 
 InterRegio services (IR) Ostrów Wielkopolski — Łódź — Warszawa Główna
 InterRegio services (IR) Poznań Główny — Ostrów Wielkopolski — Łódź — Warszawa Główna
Regional services (ŁKA) Łódz - Warsaw

See also
Rail transport in Poland
List of busiest railway stations in Poland

References

Station article at 
 Live video stream and recordings at YouTube channel— Urząd Transportu Kolejowego

Railway stations in Poland opened in 1936
Zachodnia
Railway stations served by Szybka Kolej Miejska (Warsaw)
Railway stations served by Warszawska Kolej Dojazdowa
Railway stations served by Koleje Mazowieckie
Railway stations served by Przewozy Regionalne InterRegio
Ochota
Wola